Jean-Pierre Rouget (born 22 February 1941) is a French former racing driver.

References

1941 births
Living people
French racing drivers
French Formula Three Championship drivers
24 Hours of Le Mans drivers
European Rally Championship drivers
World Rally Championship drivers